The Edward Wadley House at 2445 N. Canyon Rd. in Pleasant Grove, Utah was built in 1893.  It was listed on the National Register of Historic Places in 1987.

It was built of soft rock.

References

Houses completed in 1893
Houses in Utah County, Utah
Houses on the National Register of Historic Places in Utah
National Register of Historic Places in Utah County, Utah
Buildings and structures in Pleasant Grove, Utah